The Forgotten Woman is a 1939 American drama film directed by Harold Young and written by Lionel Houser and Harold Buchman. The film stars Sigrid Gurie, William Lundigan, Eve Arden, Donald Briggs, Donnie Dunagan and Elisabeth Risdon. The film was released on July 7, 1939, by Universal Pictures.

Plot

Cast        
Sigrid Gurie as Anne Kennedy
William Lundigan as Terrence Kennedy
Eve Arden as Carrie Ashburn
Donald Briggs as Dist. Atty. Burke
Donnie Dunagan as Terry Kennedy Jr.
Elisabeth Risdon as Margaret Burke
Paul Harvey as Charles Courtenay
Ray Walker as Marty Larkin
Virginia Brissac as Mrs. Kimball
Joe Downing as Johnny Bradshaw
Norman Willis as Stu Mantle
George Walcott as Frank Lockridge
John Hamilton as Dr. May

References

External links
 

1939 films
American drama films
1939 drama films
Universal Pictures films
Films directed by Harold Young (director)
American black-and-white films
1930s English-language films
1930s American films